Lefever House is a Bungalow/Craftsman style house located in Kingman, Arizona. The house is listed on the National Register of Historic Places.

Description 
Lefever House was built around 1900 and is of the Bungalow/Craftsman style. The home is one of the oldest wood-frame home in the city. Mr. Lefever was the Mohave County Recorder starting in 1898. The home was added to the National Register of Historic Places in 1996.

It was evaluated for National Register listing as part of a 1985 study of 63 historic resources in Kingman that led to this and many others being listed.

References

Houses completed in 1900
American Craftsman architecture in Arizona
Houses in Kingman, Arizona
Houses on the National Register of Historic Places in Arizona
National Register of Historic Places in Kingman, Arizona